Strömsund is a locality and the seat of Strömsund Municipality in Jämtland County, Sweden with 3,589 inhabitants in 2010.

Stroms church  (Ströms kyrka) was inaugurated in 1847.The Grand Hotel dates to 1909. The Court House (Tingshuset) was inaugurated in 1911 and was designed by architect Frans Bertil Wallberg (1862-1935). Strömsund railway station was built in 1913.  Strömsund Bridge (Strömsundsbron), a cable-stayed road bridge, bringing European route E45 over Ströms vattudal  in Strömsund,  opened in 1956. Strömsund's Municipal Building (Strömsunds kommunalhus) was designed by architect firm Klemming & Thelaus in 1958.

Strömsund is noted for being pictured in the 1974 Swedish movie Dunderklumpen! directed by Per Åhlin.

The following sports clubs are located in Strömsund:
 IFK Strömsund 
 IBK Strömsund

Gallery

References 

Populated places in Strömsund Municipality
Municipal seats of Jämtland County
Swedish municipal seats
Jämtland